WPA may refer to:

Computing
Wi-Fi Protected Access, a wireless encryption standard
Windows Product Activation, in Microsoft software licensing
Wireless Public Alerting (Alert Ready), emergency alerts over LTE in Canada
Windows Performance Analyzer

Organizations 
Wisconsin Philosophical Association
World Pool-Billiard Association
World Psychiatric Association
Western Provident Association, United Kingdom

United States
Works Progress Administration or Work Projects Administration, a former American New Deal agency
Washington Project for the Arts
Western Psychological Association
Women's Prison Association

Other
WPA, a 2009 album by Works Progress Administration (band)
Win probability added, a baseball statistic
Water pinch analysis
Whistleblower Protection Act, a law protecting certain whistleblowers in the USA
Woomera Prohibited Area, a tract of land in South Australia covering more than 120,000 sq km of arid 'outback'
Waterfowl production area, land protected through easements or purchase to conserve habitat for waterfowl in the United States
An abbreviation for Western Pennsylvania